"New Thing" is a song by American rock band Enuff Z'Nuff that was released as a single in 1989. This song, along with "Fly High Michelle", is considered one of their biggest hits.

Music video
The song's video was placed into heavy rotation on MTV, and was put on the New York Times list of the "15 Essential Hair-Metal Videos".

Charts

References

1989 singles
Atco Records singles
1989 songs
Enuff Z'nuff songs